Disodium cocoamphodiacetate (DSCADA) is a synthetic amphoteric surfactant routinely used in personal care products.

Biodegradability
A 2008 study suggested high levels of DSCADA (>216 mg/L) may be toxic to bacteria in wastewater treatment processes. Results from the 2008 research indicated that DSCADA has limited biodegradability and recalcitrant metabolites may develop.

References

Antiseptics
Cosmetics chemicals
Anionic surfactants
Organic sodium salts